Anthony Smith was the Republican President of the West Virginia Senate from Tyler County and served from 1901 to 1903.

Early and family life

He was born January 9, 1844, in Beaver County, Pennsylvania. At age 4, he moved with his father to Virginia (years before the state of West Virginia was created). On August 14, 1862, when he was 18 years old, he enrolled in Company F, Fourteenth Regiment, West Virginia Volunteer Infantry. He served for two years before being captured. He remained a prisoner of war until the Confederacy was defeated.

Career

He served numerous political offices over the years, including state delegate, state senator, and prosecuting attorney of Tyler County. He was President of the Senate during his last term. In 1888 he was a Presidential elector.

On December 20, 1870, he married Martha F. Holland, they had two children, a son and daughter.

Death and legacy

He died sometime in the 1920s.

References

Republican Party members of the West Virginia House of Delegates
Republican Party West Virginia state senators
Presidents of the West Virginia State Senate
Year of death missing
1844 births
People from Beaver County, Pennsylvania
Pennsylvania Republicans
20th-century American politicians
People from Harrisville, West Virginia